Stovin is a surname. Notable people with the surname include: 

Frederick Stovin (1783–1865), British Army officer
Fred Stovin-Bradford (1919–1974), Royal Navy officer and aviator
Richard Stovin (died 1825), British Army officer